Saints Modestinus, Florentinus and Flavianus are three Christian martyrs of Campania, Italy, martyred in 311. Their relics were re-discovered in 1167 by Gugliemo, bishop of Avellino. Like others, they had taken refuge on Monte Vergine.

They are the patron saints of the city and diocese of Avellino, and of the city of Mercogliano. They are also joint patron saints of the city of Locri and of the Diocese of Locri-Gerace in Calabria.

Avellino Cathedral is dedicated to Saint Modestinus, a bishop of Antioch. His feast day is 14 February, the date of his death. Florentinus and Flavianus, respectively deacon and priest, died on 15 February but are celebrated with Modestinus on 14 February.

References

Sources
Santiebeati.it: Santi Modestino, Fiorentino e Flaviano 
Diocese of Avellino official website 

Saints from Roman Italy
4th-century Christian martyrs
311 deaths